Bobbio Cathedral is a Roman Catholic cathedral in Bobbio, Emilia-Romagna, Italy, dedicated to the Assumption of the Virgin Mary. Formerly the episcopal seat of the Diocese of Bobbio, it became in 1986 a co-cathedral of the Archdiocese of Genova, then in 1989 a co-cathedral of the Diocese of Piacenza-Bobbio.

See also 
Catholic Church in Italy

References 

Roman Catholic cathedrals in Italy
Churches in the province of Piacenza
Cathedrals in Emilia-Romagna